James W. Bierman Jr. is a United States Marine Corps lieutenant general who serves as the commanding general of III Marine Expeditionary Force and Marine Forces Japan since November 9, 2021. He most recently served as Commanding General of the 3rd Marine Division from August 12, 2020 to November 8, 2021. Previously, he served as the Commanding General of the Marine Corps Recruiting Command from June 7, 2018 to July 17, 2020.

In March 2023, Bierman was reassigned as deputy commandant for plans, policies and operations of the United States Marine Corps.

References

Living people
Place of birth missing (living people)
Recipients of the Defense Superior Service Medal
Recipients of the Legion of Merit
United States Marine Corps generals
United States Marine Corps personnel of the Gulf War
United States Marine Corps personnel of the Iraq War
United States Marine Corps personnel of the War in Afghanistan (2001–2021)
Year of birth missing (living people)